PS Cardiff Queen was a passenger vessel built for P & A Campbell in 1947.

History

She was built in 1947 by Fairfield, Govan, and launched on 25 February 1947 by Mrs W.J. Banks, wife of the managing director of P & A Campbell.

She was built as a replacement for ships lost during the Second World War, and operated pleasure cruises in the Bristol Channel, often to Ilfracombe. She entered service on 21 June 1947.

On 27 August 1949, she ran aground on Lynmouth Sand Ridge. The  was fetched from Ilfracombe to take the passengers on board.

On 9 April 1968 she sailed for the last time to Cashmore’s scrap yard at Newport on the mouth of the Usk.

References

1947 ships
Passenger ships of the United Kingdom
Steamships of the United Kingdom
Paddle steamers of the United Kingdom
Ships built on the River Clyde